Kalvanin Kadhali is a 1955 Indian Tamil-language romantic crime film directed by V. S. Raghavan and written by S. D. Sundharam. Starring Sivaji Ganesan and P. Bhanumathi, it is based on the novel of the same name by Kalki Krishnamurthy. The film was released on 13 November 1955.

Plot 

At the Poonkulam village, Kalyani and Muthayyan are lovers. Circumstances brand Muthayyan a dacoit, but Kalyani remains steadfast in her love. Evading the police, Muthayyan leads the life of an exile in the forest. When things come to a head, Muthayyan and Kalyani decide to run away to some far-off place and settle down to marital bliss. Muthayyan's loyal friend Kamalapathi, a stage actor, makes all arrangements for their escape. In order to hoodwink the vigilant police inspector Shastri, Kamalapathi disguises himself as a woman and goes to the forest to meet Muthayyan and appraise him of the plans.

When Kalyani comes to the appointed place, she finds Muthayyan embracing another woman. Not realising that it is Kamalapathi whom Muthayyan is expressing his heartfelt thanks to, she suspects her lover's loyalty and runs away in a rage. Inspector Shastri, who is also in disguise, meets Kalyani at this juncture and enquires Muthayyan's whereabouts. Unthinking in her anger, Kalyani blurts out Muthayyan's location. Seeing Shastri run with his gun, Kalyani realises that he is a police officer, and runs after him. Muthayyan is shot dead by the police, and Kalyani commits suicide to reunite with him in death.

Cast 
Sivaji Ganesan as Muthayyan
P. Bhanumathi as Kalyani
T. R. Ramachandran as Kamalapathy
K. Sarangapani as Inspector Saambu Shastri
T. S. Durairaj as Sangu Pillai
T. D. Kusalakumari as Abirami
D. Balasubramaniam as Kalyani's father
S. R. Janaki as Kamalapathi's mother
K. R. Chellam as Meenakshi, Shastri's wife
P. D. Sambandam as Maniyam
P. S. Venkatachalam as Pannaiyar Pachanatham Pillai
T. N. Sivadhanu as Ratnam Pillai

Production 
Drawing inspiration from a dacoit in Thanjavur, Kalki Krishnamurthy wrote a story titled Kalvanin Kadhali with the intention of making it a film. Unable to attract investors, he instead published the screenplay as a serial novel in the magazine Ananda Vikatan upon advice from S. S. Vasan. In 1949, after Nallathambi (1949), N. S. Krishnan announced that a film version of Kalvanin Kadhali would be his next project, with C. N. Annadurai as writer, but the project never came to fruition. The film rights to the novel were later acquired by Revathi Productions, who launched the film with V. S. Raghavan as director and S. D. Sundharam as screenwriter.

Soundtrack 
The music composed by G. Govindarajulu Naidu & Ghantasala. Lyrics by Mahakavi Bharathiyar, Kavimani Desigavinayagam Pillai and S. D. Sundharam.

Release 
Kalvanin Kadhali was released on 13 November 1955, Diwali day. The film was released in five theatres – Gaiety, Mahalakshmi, Sayani, Rajakumari and Prabhat – and completed a theatrical run of 80 days. According to historian Randor Guy, the sequences where Ganesan delivers "long-winding dialogue in high flown Tamil, filled with alliterative phrases" felt incongruous since his character was an illiterate thief.

References

External links 
 

1950s romance films
1950s Tamil-language films
1955 crime films
1955 films
Adaptations of works by Kalki Krishnamurthy
Indian black-and-white films
Indian crime films
Indian romance films
Romantic crime films